Wheel of Fortune (often known simply as Wheel) is an American television game show created by Merv Griffin. The show has aired continuously since January 1975. It features a competition in which contestants solve word puzzles, similar to those in hangman, to win cash and prizes determined by spinning a giant carnival wheel. The current version of the series, which airs in nightly syndication, premiered on September 19, 1983. It stars Pat Sajak and Vanna White as hosts, who have hosted the nighttime version since its inception. The original version of Wheel was a network daytime series that ran on NBC from January 6, 1975, to June 30, 1989, and  subsequently aired on CBS from July 17, 1989, to January 11, 1991; it returned to NBC on January 14, 1991, and was cancelled that year, ending on September 20, 1991. (The network daytime and syndicated nighttime versions aired concurrently with each other from 1983 until the former's conclusion.)

The network version was originally hosted by Chuck Woolery and Susan Stafford. Woolery left in 1981, and was replaced by Sajak. Sajak left the network version in January 1989 to host his own late-night talk show, while remaining as host of the nighttime Wheel. Sajak was replaced in daytime by Rolf Benirschke, who was in turn replaced by Bob Goen when the network show moved to CBS. Goen remained as host for the second NBC run. Stafford left in 1982 and was replaced by White, who remained on the network show for the rest of its run. The show has also had four announcers in its history: Charlie O'Donnell, Jack Clark, M. G. Kelly, and Jim Thornton.

Two spin-off versions exist as well. The first was Wheel 2000, a version featuring child contestants which aired simultaneously on CBS and Game Show Network between 1997 and 1998. This version's hosts were David Sidoni and Tanika Ray, the latter in the role of a CGI hostess named "Cyber Lucy". The second, Celebrity Wheel of Fortune, began airing on ABC on January 7, 2021 and features celebrities playing a modified version of the game with winnings donated to charity.

Wheel of Fortune ranks as the longest-running syndicated game show in the United States, with 7,000 episodes taped and aired as of May 10, 2019. TV Guide named it the "top-rated syndicated series" in a 2008 article, and in 2013, the magazine ranked it at No. 2 in its list of the 60 greatest game shows ever. The program has also come to gain a worldwide following with 60 international adaptations. The syndicated series' 40th season premiered on September 12, 2022, and Sajak became the longest-running host of any game show, surpassing Bob Barker, who hosted The Price Is Right from 1972 to 2007.

Gameplay

Main game
Wheel of Fortune is based on hangman. In each round, three players compete to be the first to guess all of the unknown words in a word puzzle, which is displayed visually on a board containing 52 spaces. At the start of each round, the host reveals the category. In general, puzzles must be read exactly, except for crossword puzzles, which were added to the show in 2016. In such rounds, the host gives a clue linking the words in the puzzle; contestants can win by giving all the words in the crossword in any order, but must not repeat any words or add any additional words.

The titular Wheel of Fortune is a roulette-style wheel with 24 wedges. Most are labeled with dollar amounts ranging from $500 to $900, with a top value in each round: $2,500 in round 1, $3,500 in rounds 2 and 3, and $5,000 for round 4 and any subsequent rounds. The wheel also features two Bankrupt wedges and one Lose a Turn wedge. Landing on either forfeits the contestant's turn, with the Bankrupt wedge also eliminating any cash or prizes the contestant has accumulated within the round.

Most matches consist of three contestants, although some variants feature three teams of two people each. Contestants in control spin the wheel to determine a dollar value, then guess a consonant. Landing on a dollar amount and calling a correct consonant results in the hostess revealing every instance of that letter, also awarding the value of the spin multiplied by the number of times the letter appears in the puzzle. Calling a correct consonant allows the contestant to spin again, buy a vowel for a flat rate of $250 (until no more remain in the puzzle), or attempt to solve the puzzle. Control passes to the next contestant clockwise if the contestant lands on Lose a Turn or Bankrupt, calls a letter not in the puzzle, calls a letter already called in that round, fails to call a letter, or attempts unsuccessfully to solve the puzzle. In Celebrity Wheel of Fortune, each episode features two full games and each round has an additional bonus money: $5,000 in the first round, $10,000 in the second round, $20,000 in the third round (and additional rounds in the second game). The celebrities' winnings are also reset at the start of the second game and are contributed to the combined total with the winnings from both games.

Each game also features five toss-up puzzles, which reveal the puzzle one random letter at a time and award cash to whoever rings in with the right answer. The first, worth $1,000, determines who the host interviews first. The second, worth $2,000, determines who spins first in round one. The third through fifth, collectively the "Triple Toss-Up", take place prior to the fourth round. In the Triple Toss-Up round, three consecutive puzzles are played, each with the same category and a common theme. Solving any awards $2,000 cash ($5,000 in Celebrity Wheel of Fortune), while solving the third also earns the right to start the fourth round. Beginning in 2021, an additional $4,000 is awarded for a total of $10,000 if the same contestant solves all three. Contestants may only ring in once for each toss-up puzzle, and no cash is awarded if all three fail to solve; if this occurs, then the contestant at the red arrow controls the next portion of the game. In addition to the toss-ups, each game has a minimum of four rounds, with more played if time permits. Rounds 2 and 3 are respectively started by the next two contestants clockwise from the contestant who began round 1.

In the first three rounds, the wheel contains two special tokens which are claimed by calling a correct letter. The first is the Wild Card, which allows the opportunity to call a second letter after a correct letter (for the same value as the present spin); it may also be taken to the bonus round and used to select an extra consonant. The other is the Gift Tag, which awards $1,000 credit to a sponsored company. There is also a special wedge which offers a pre-determined prize, typically a trip or credit to a company, if claimed. All three of these also offer $500 per correct letter. The first three rounds also contain a special wedge known as the "Million Dollar Wedge", in which, if won and taken to the bonus round, offers an opportunity to play for $1,000,000. In Celebrity Wheel of Fortune, four Million Dollar Wedges (albeit without the Bankrupt spaces, which are also used in certain weeks in Season 40, known as "XL Week", in which have two Million Dollar Wedges placed on the wheel) were placed on the wheel starting from the second round of each game, but are returned to the wheel in the next round, if it's taken away via a Bankrupt or the contestant didn't solve the puzzle. A contestant must solve the puzzle in order to keep any cash, prizes, or extras accumulated during that round except for the Wild Card. Bankrupt does not affect score from previous rounds, but it takes away the Wild Card and/or the Million Dollar Wedge if either was claimed in a previous round. Contestants who solve a round for less than $1,000 in cash and prizes ($2,000 on weeks with two-contestant teams) have their scores increased to that amount.

Round 2 features two "Mystery Wedges." Calling a correct letter on one offers the chance to accept its face value of $1,000 per letter, or forfeit that to flip over the wedge and see whether its reverse side contains a $10,000 cash prize or Bankrupt. Once one is flipped over, the other becomes a standard $1,000 space and cannot be flipped. Round 3 is a Prize Puzzle, which offers a prize (usually a trip) to the contestant who solves. In certain weeks of Season 40, known as "XL Week", which is known as an "XL Prize Puzzle", an additional $5,000 is added to the prize. Starting from Season 3 of Celebrity Wheel of Fortune, this only happens in the first game, as celebirties are playing for the prize to an at-home viewer. Since 2013, this round also has an "Express" wedge. A contestant who lands on this space and calls a consonant that appears in the puzzle receives $1,000 per appearance. The contestant can then either "pass" and continue the round normally, or "play" and keep calling consonants for $1,000 each (without spinning) and buying vowels for $250. If the contestant calls an incorrect letter, runs out of time during the Express, or solves the puzzle incorrectly, it is treated as a Bankrupt.

The final round of every game (or the second game in Celebrity Wheel of Fortune) is always played at least in part as a "speed-up", which is indicated by a bell sounding. At this point, the contestant who is in control of the wheel takes the "final spin". Prior to Season 39, the host performed the final spin. When the final spin lands on a dollar amount, that amount has $1,000 added to create the value of a consonant for the rest of the game, and vowels are free. If the final spin lands on anything that is not a dollar amount, it is edited from the broadcast and another one is performed until one lands on a dollar amount. The contestant in control calls one letter and has three seconds to attempt solving after doing so. Calling a wrong or repeated letter, or failing to solve within three seconds, passes control to the next contestant clockwise, and this process repeats until the puzzle is solved.

After the speed-up round, the contestant with the highest total winnings wins the game and advances to the bonus round. Contestants who did not solve any puzzles are awarded a consolation prize of $1,000 (or $2,000 on weeks with two-contestant teams). In Celebrity Wheel of Fortune, celebrities who have the total combined winnings of under $30,000 after the second game will automatically bump up to that value. If a tie for first place occurs after the speed-up, an additional toss-up puzzle is played between the tied contestants. The contestant who solves the toss-up puzzle wins $1,000 and advances to the bonus round.

Bonus round
Since 2017, the winning contestant chooses one of three puzzle categories before the round begins (prior to 2017, the category and puzzle were predetermined). After doing so, the contestant spins a smaller wheel with 24 envelopes to determine the prize. The puzzle is revealed, as is every instance of the letters R, S, T, L, N, and E. The contestant provides three more consonants and one more vowel, plus a fourth consonant if he or she has the Wild Card. After any instances of those letters are revealed, the contestant has 10 seconds to solve the puzzle; he or she may make multiple guesses, as long as the entire answer is started before time expires. Whether or not the contestant solves the puzzle, the host opens the envelope at the end of the round to reveal the prize at stake. Prizes in the bonus round include various cash amounts (with the lowest being the season number multiplied by $1,000), a vehicle (or two vehicles during weeks with two-contestant teams), and a top prize of $100,000. During certain weeks in Season 40, known as "XL Week", if the contestant has the XL Wedge, an additional $40,000 is added to the contestant's winnings if he or she solves the puzzle. In Home Sweet Home Week, another top prize was added, in a form of a house, courtesy of Latitude Margaritaville, worth $375,000 ($350,000 in Season 35 and 36) for participants aged 55 or over, and with a smaller option for other contestants, or a cash alternative, which can be won by getting the special House wedge, in the same vein as the Million Dollar Wedge in Seasons 35 to 38. Starting in Season 39, two house envelopes will be on the prize wheel if the contestant has brought the House wedge to the bonus round (one house envelope will always be in the prize wheel, regardless of possession of the House wedge). In Celebrity Wheel of Fortune, the prizes are all cash amounts for the celebrity's charity, which includes $25,000, $50,000, $75,000, and $100,000.

If the contestant has the Million Dollar Wedge, the $100,000 envelope (or one of four in Celebrity Wheel of Fortune) is replaced with a $1,000,000 envelope (two in certain weeks of Season 40, known as "XL Week", if the contestant has the Million Dollar Wedge, replacing a $40,000 envelope in the process; as in which the host reveals the locations of the two $1,000,000 envelopes after the bonus round; if the bonus wheel's spin did not land on one of the two $1,000,000 envelopes). The $1,000,000 prize has been awarded four times overall (three from the regular version and one from Celebrity Wheel of Fortune) to Michelle Loewenstein (Regular version; October 14, 2008), Autumn Erhard (Regular version; May 30, 2013), Sarah Manchester (Regular version; September 17, 2014), and Melissa Joan Hart (Youth Villages) (Celebrity Wheel of Fortune; October 17, 2021). In the regular version, contestants who win the $1,000,000 may receive it in installments over 20 years, or in a lump sum of that amount's present value. If the bonus round wheel's spin did not land on the $1,000,000 envelope, the host reveals the location of the $1,000,000 envelope after the bonus round.

Previous rules
Originally, after winning a round, contestants spent their winnings on prize showcases that were presented onstage. At any time during a shopping round, a contestant could choose to put his or her winnings either on a gift certificate or "on account" for use in a later shopping round. Money put "on account" was lost if the contestant hit Bankrupt or failed to solve another puzzle. The shopping element was eliminated from the syndicated version on the episode that aired October 5, 1987, both to speed up gameplay and to alleviate the taxes paid by contestants. However, the network version continued to use shopping until the end of its first NBC run on June 30, 1989.

Before the introduction of toss-up puzzles in 2000, the contestant at the red arrow always started the first round, with the next contestant clockwise starting each subsequent round. In addition, ties for first place were broken by another speed-up round. If a tie for first place occurred on the daytime version, all three players returned to continue the game on the next episode, and it counted as a single appearance. The wheel formerly featured a Free Spin wedge, which automatically awarded a token that the contestant could turn in after a lost turn to keep control of the wheel. It was replaced in 1989 with a single Free Spin token placed over a selected cash wedge. Free Spin was retired in 2009. From 2009 to 2021, landing on the Free Play was a wedge that allowed a contestant to call any consonant or a free vowel and keep his or her turn even if the letter was not in the puzzle.

Between September 16, 1996 and 2013, the show featured a progressive Jackpot wedge, which had been in several different rounds in its history. The jackpot began at $5,000 and had the value of every spin within the round added to it. To claim the jackpot, a contestant had to land on the wedge, call a correct letter, and solve the puzzle all in the same turn. In later years, it also offered $500 per correct letter and $500 to the jackpot, regardless of whether or not it was won in that turn.

The network version allowed champions to appear for up to five days originally, which was later reduced to three. The syndicated version, which originally retired contestants after one episode, adopted the three-day champion rule in 1989. In 1996, this was changed to have the top three winners from the week's first four shows returned to compete in the "Friday Finals". When the jackpot wedge was introduced, it began at $10,000 instead of $5,000 on Fridays. The rules allowing returning champions were eliminated permanently beginning with the syndicated episode aired September 21, 1998, and contestants appear only on a single episode, reverting to the pre-1989 rules.

Before December 1981, the show did not feature a permanent bonus round. However, two experimental bonus rounds were attempted before then. In 1978, some episodes featured a round known as the "Star Bonus", where a star-shaped token was placed on the wheel. Contestants who picked up the token played an additional round at the end of the game to win one of four prizes, whose value determined the difficulty of the puzzle. The contestant provided four consonants and a vowel, and was given 15 seconds to attempt solving. In one week of episodes airing in March 1980, contestants who won the main game were given 30 seconds to attempt solving a puzzle for a chance to win a luxury automobile, in a week called "Super Wheel Bonus Week". When the current bonus round was introduced in 1981, no letters were provided automatically. The contestant asked for five consonants and a vowel, and then had fifteen seconds to attempt solving the puzzle. Also, bonus prizes were selected by the contestant at the start of the round. The current time limit and rules for letter selection were introduced on October 3, 1988. Starting on September 4, 1989, bonus prizes were selected by the contestant choosing from one of five envelopes labeled W, H, E, E, and L. One prize was always $25,000 in cash, and the rest were changed weekly. Any prize that was won was taken out of rotation for the rest of the week. From 1998 to 2001, the $25,000 remained in-place for each episode during the entire week, regardless if it was won. In 2001, three car envelopes and two $25,000 envelopes were available the entire week of shows. These envelopes were replaced with the bonus wheel on October 22, 2001. If the bonus round wheel's spin did not land on the $100,000 envelope, the host reveals the location of the $100,000 envelope after the bonus round.

Conception and development
Merv Griffin conceived Wheel of Fortune using inspiration from hangman, which he would play with his sister on family road trips. After he discussed the idea with Merv Griffin Enterprises' staff, they thought that the idea would work as a game show if it had a "hook". He decided to add a roulette-style wheel because he was always "drawn to" such wheels when he saw them in casinos. He and Merv Griffin Enterprises' then-president Murray Schwartz consulted an executive of Caesars Palace to find out how to build such a wheel.

When Griffin pitched the idea for the show to Lin Bolen, then the head of NBC's daytime programming division, she approved, but wanted the show to have more glamour to attract the female audience. She suggested that Griffin incorporate a shopping element into the gameplay, and so, in 1973, he created a pilot episode titled Shopper's Bazaar, with Chuck Woolery as host and Mike Lawrence as announcer. The pilot started with the three contestants being introduced individually, with Lawrence describing the prizes that they chose to play for. The main game was played to four rounds, with the values on the wheel wedges increasing after the second round. Unlike the show it evolved into, Shopper's Bazaar had a vertically mounted wheel, which was spun automatically rather than by the contestants. This wheel lacked the Bankrupt wedge and featured a wedge where a contestant could call a vowel for free, as well as a "Your Own Clue" wedge that allowed contestants to pick up a rotary telephone and hear a private clue about the puzzle. At the end of the game, the highest-scoring contestant played a bonus round called the "Shopper's Special" where all the vowels in the puzzle were already there, and the contestant had 30 seconds to call out consonants in the puzzle.

Edd Byrnes, an actor from 77 Sunset Strip, served as host for the second and third pilots, both titled Wheel of Fortune. These pilots were directed by Marty Pasetta, who gave the show an aesthetic that more closely resembled the look and feel that the actual show ended up having, a wheel that was now spun by the contestants themselves, and a lighted mechanical puzzle board with letters that were now manually turnable. Showcase prizes on these pilots were located behind the puzzle board, and during shopping segments a list of prizes and their price values scrolled on the right of the screen. By the time production began in December 1974, Woolery was selected to host, the choice being made by Griffin after he reportedly heard Byrnes reciting "A-E-I-O-U" to himself in an effort to remember the vowels. Susan Stafford turned the letters on Byrnes' pilot episodes, a role that she also held when the show was picked up as a series.

Personnel

Hosts and hostesses

The original host of Wheel of Fortune was Chuck Woolery, who hosted the series from its 1975 premiere until December 25, 1981, save for one week in August 1980 when Alex Trebek hosted in his place. Woolery's departure came over a salary dispute with show creator Merv Griffin, and his contract was not renewed. On December 28, 1981, Pat Sajak made his debut as the host of Wheel. Griffin said that he chose Sajak for his "odd" sense of humor. NBC president and CEO Fred Silverman objected as he felt Sajak, who at the time of his hiring was the weatherman for KNBC, was "too local" for a national audience. Griffin countered by telling Silverman he would stop production if Sajak was not allowed to become host, and Silverman acquiesced.

Sajak hosted the daytime series until January 9, 1989, when he left to host a late-night talk show for CBS. The show's producers auditioned a number of potential successors upon his departure. These potential replacements included Michael Reagan, John Davidson, Bert Convy, and Tim Brando. Rolf Benirschke, a former placekicker in the National Football League, was chosen as his replacement and hosted for a little more than five months. Benirschke's term as host came to an end due to NBC's cancellation of the daytime Wheel after fourteen years, with its final episode airing on June 30, 1989. When the newly formatted daytime series returned on CBS on July 17, 1989, Bob Goen became its host. The daytime program continued for a year and a half on CBS, then returned to NBC on January 14, 1991, and continued until September 20, 1991, when it was cancelled for a second and final time.

Susan Stafford was the original hostess, serving in that role from the premiere until October 1982. Stafford was absent for two extended periods, once in 1977 after fracturing two vertebrae in her back and once in 1979 after an automobile accident. During these two extended absences, former Miss USA Summer Bartholomew was Stafford's most frequent substitute, with model Cynthia Washington and comedian Arte Johnson also filling in for Stafford.

After Stafford left to become a humanitarian worker, over two hundred applicants signed up for a nationwide search to be her replacement. Griffin eventually narrowed the list to three finalists, which consisted of Summer Bartholomew, former Playboy centerfold Vicki McCarty, and Vanna White. Griffin gave each of the three women an opportunity to win the job by putting them in a rotation for several weeks after Stafford's departure. In December 1982, Griffin named White as Stafford's successor, saying that he felt she was capable of activating the puzzle board letters (which is the primary role of the Wheel hostess) better than anyone else who had auditioned. White became highly popular among the young female demographic, and also gained a fanbase of adults interested in her daily wardrobe, in a phenomenon that has been referred to as "Vannamania". White also hosted the daytime version until its cancellation in 1991, except for one week in June 1986 when Stafford returned so that White could recover after her fiancé, John Gibson, died in a plane crash.

Sajak and White have starred on the syndicated version continuously as host and hostess, respectively, since it began, except for very limited occasions. During two weeks in January 1991, Tricia Gist, the girlfriend and future wife of Griffin's son Tony, filled in for White when she and her new husband, restaurateur George San Pietro, were honeymooning. Gist returned for the week of episodes airing March 11 through 15, 1991, because White had a cold at the time of taping. On an episode in November 1996, when Sajak proved unable to host the bonus round segment because of laryngitis, he and White traded places for that segment. On the March 4, 1997 episode, Rosie O'Donnell co-hosted the third round with White after O'Donnell's name was used in a puzzle.

On April 1, 1997, Sajak and Alex Trebek traded jobs for the day. Sajak hosted that day's edition of Jeopardy! in place of Trebek. Trebek presided over a special two-contestant Wheel celebrity match between Sajak and White, who were playing for the Boy Scouts of America and the American Cancer Society, respectively. Lesly Sajak, Pat's wife, was the guest hostess for the day. In January and February 2011, the show held a "Vanna for a Day" contest in which home viewers submitted video auditions to take White's place for one episode, with the winner determined by a poll on the show's website. The winner of this contest, Katie Cantrell of Wooster, Ohio (a student at the Savannah College of Art and Design), took White's place for the second and third rounds on the episode that aired March 24, 2011.

In November 2019, three weeks of episodes were taped with White hosting in Sajak's place while he recovered from intestinal surgery. During her time as hostess, several guests appeared at the puzzle board, including costumed performers of Mickey and Minnie Mouse (during the Secret Santa shows), and Maggie Sajak (Sajak's daughter). Maggie joined the show as a special correspondent, making appearances similar to the "Clue Crew" on companion program Jeopardy!, in September 2021.

Announcers

Charlie O'Donnell was the program's first and longest tenured announcer. In 1980, NBC was discussing cancelling Wheel and O'Donnell agreed to take the position as announcer on The Toni Tennille Show. The network decided against the cancellation but O'Donnell decided to honor his commitment and left the series. His replacement was Jack Clark, who added the syndicated series to his responsibilities when it premiered in 1983 and announced for both series until his death in July 1988. Los Angeles radio personality M. G. Kelly was Clark's replacement, starting on the daytime series in August 1988 and on the syndicated series a month later. Kelly held these positions until O'Donnell was able to return to the announcer position, doing so after his duties with Barris Industries came to an end at the end in 1989. O'Donnell remained with the series until shortly before his death in November 2010. Don Pardo, Don Morrow, and Johnny Gilbert have occasionally served as substitute announcers.

After O'Donnell's death, the producers sought a permanent replacement, and a series of substitutes announced, including Gilbert, John Cramer, Joe Cipriano, Rich Fields, Lora Cain, and Jim Thornton. In 2011, Thornton was chosen to be the show's fourth announcer. In season 39, Thornton appeared on-camera at the start of every episode.

Production staff
Wheel of Fortune typically employs a total of 100 in-house production personnel, with 60 to 100 local staff joining them for those episodes that are taped on location. Griffin was the executive producer of the network version throughout its entire run, and served as the syndicated version's executive producer until his retirement in 2000. Since 1999, the title of executive producer has been held by Harry Friedman, who had shared his title with Griffin for his first year, and had earlier served as a producer starting in 1995.

On August 1, 2019, Sony Pictures Television announced that Friedman would retire as executive producer of both Wheel and Jeopardy! at the end of the 2019–20 season. On August 29, 2019, Sony Pictures Television announced that Mike Richards would replace Friedman at the start of 2020–21 season. Following Richards' earlier resignation as permanent host of Jeopardy!, he was fired on August 31, 2021, from his executive producer position at both Jeopardy! and Wheel. A Sony memo indicated that Michael Davies from Embassy Row would serve as interim executive producer of both Wheel and Jeopardy!; however, Davies was not credited on any episodes of Wheel, and Deadline subsequently reported that supervising producer Steve Schwartz oversaw the balance of the show's 39th season. Sajak was named a consulting producer in September 2021. On March 23, 2022, Bellamie Blackstone was announced to be a permanent executive producer for Wheel, with Schwartz getting promoted to co-executive producer.

John Rhinehart was the program's first producer, but departed in August 1976 to become NBC's West Coast Daytime Program Development Director. Afterwards, his co-producer, Nancy Jones, was promoted to sole producer, and served as such until 1995, when Friedman succeeded her. In 1997, Karen Griffith and Steve Schwartz joined Friedman as producers. They were later promoted to supervising producers, with Amanda Stern occupying Griffith's and Schwartz's former position.

The show's original director was Jeff Goldstein, who was succeeded by Dick Carson (a brother of Johnny Carson) in 1978. Mark Corwin, who had served as associate director under Carson, took over for him upon his retirement at the end of the 1998–99 season, and served as such until he himself died in July 2013 (although episodes already taped before his death continued airing until late 2013). Jeopardy! director Kevin McCarthy, Corwin's associate director Bob Cisneros, and Wheel and Jeopardy! technical director Robert Ennis filled in at various points, until Cisneros became full-time director in November 2013. Ennis returned as guest director for the weeks airing October 13 through 17 and November 17 through 21, 2014, as Cisneros was recovering from neck surgery at the time of taping. On September 14, 2015, Ennis was promoted to full-time director.

Production
Wheel of Fortune is owned by Sony Pictures Television (previously known as Columbia TriStar Television, the successor company to original producer Merv Griffin Enterprises). The production company and copyright holder of all episodes to date is Califon Productions, Inc., which like SPT has Sony Pictures for its active registered agent, and whose name comes from a New Jersey town where Griffin once owned a farm. The rights to distribute the show worldwide are owned by CBS Media Ventures, into which original distributor King World Productions was folded in 2007.

Wheel of Fortune originally taped at NBC Studios in Burbank. The first fourteen years of the daytime series, as well as the first six of the syndicated series, emanated from Studio 4.

At the conclusion of the 1988–89 television season, which saw NBC drop the daytime series from its lineup, Wheel left Burbank and production moved to CBS Television City in Los Angeles. Both the nightly series and a relaunched daytime series taped in Studio 33 upon the move. The daytime series remained in production until 1991, by which point it had returned to NBC, while the syndicated series remained at Television City until 1995. After that, the show moved to its current home at Sony Pictures Studios in Culver City, where it occupies Stage 11. Some episodes are also recorded on location, a tradition which began with two weeks of episodes taped at Radio City Music Hall in late 1988. Recording sessions usually last for five or six episodes in one day.

Set

Various changes have been made to the basic set since the syndicated version's premiere in 1983. In 1997, a large video display was added center stage, which was then upgraded in 2003 as the show began the transition into high-definition broadcasting. In the mid-1990s, the show began a long-standing tradition of nearly every week coming with its own unique theme. As a result, in addition to its generic design, the set also uses many alternate designs, which are unique to specific weekly sets of themed programs. The most recent set design was conceived by production designer Renee Hoss-Johnson, with later modifications by Jody Vaclav. Previous set designers included Ed Flesh and Dick Stiles.

Shopper's Bazaar used a vertically mounted wheel which was often difficult to see on-screen. Ed Flesh, who also designed the sets for The $25,000 Pyramid and Jeopardy!, redesigned the wheel mechanism, in which the wheel lays flat while a camera zooms in from above. The first incarnation of the wheel was mostly made of paint and cardboard, and has since seen multiple design changes. Until the mid-1990s, the wheel spun automatically during the opening and closing of the show. The current incarnation, in use since 2003, is framed on a steel tube surrounded by Plexiglas panels and contains more than 200 lighting instruments. It is held by a stainless steel shaft with roller bearings.

The show's original puzzle board had three rows of 13 manually operated trilons, for a total of 39 spaces. On December 21, 1981, a larger board with 48 trilons in four rows (11, 13, 13, and 11 trilons) was adopted. This board was surrounded by a double-arched border of lights which flashed at the beginning and end of the round. Each trilon had three sides: a green side to represent spaces not used by the puzzle, a blank side to indicate a letter that had not been revealed, and a side with a letter on it. While the viewer saw a seamless transition to the next puzzle, with these older boards in segments where more than one puzzle was present, a stop-down of taping took place during which the board was wheeled offstage and the new puzzle loaded in by hand out of sight of the contestants. On February 24, 1997, the show introduced a computerized puzzle board composed of 52 touch-activated monitors in four rows (12 on the top and bottom rows, 14 in the middle two). During regular gameplay, when a contestant chose a letter that is in the puzzle, the monitors at those positions became illuminated and the hostess touched the right edge of each one to reveal the letter. The puzzle board was refurbished for season 40 in 2022, replacing the individual monitors for each letter with a singular video board, and using lidar sensors for touch input.

Although not typically seen by viewers, the set also includes a used letter board that shows contestants which letters are remaining in play, a scoreboard that is visible from the contestants' perspective, and a countdown clock. The used letter board is also used during the bonus round, and in at least one case, helped the contestant to see unused letters to solve a difficult puzzle.

COVID-19 accommodations
In March 2020, Sony suspended production of the show due to the COVID-19 pandemic. In August 2020, taping resumed with new safety measures. These new episodes began airing September 14, 2020.  When production began again after shutting down, new episodes taped without studio audiences with only essential staff and crew allowed onstage.

At tapings during that time, personal protective equipment was provided to everyone off-camera and behind the scenes for their safety. All staff and crew underwent testing on a regular basis, while contestants were tested before they stepped onto the set. Additionally, social distancing measures were enforced both on the set and off stage, and Sajak's and the players' podiums were widened to allow for greater physical distance between contestants during gameplay. Contestants spun the wheel with a white, tube-like device that fit over the wheel's pegs so they did not have to touch the wheel directly.

In July 2022, the show's producers announced on Facebook that live audiences would return for season 40, and posted a link for fans to secure tickets to taping dates.

At the start of season 40, most other COVID era protocols had also been lifted, with the contestants standing closer together, no longer using the white tube device to spin the wheel, and Sajak walking up and down the podium to shake hands/hug contestants at the end of the game.

Music
Alan Thicke composed the show's original theme, which was titled "Big Wheels". In 1983, it was replaced by Griffin's own composition, "Changing Keys", to allow him to derive royalties from that composition's use on both the network and syndicated versions. Steve Kaplan became music director starting in 1997, and continued to serve as such until he was killed when the Cessna 421C Golden Eagle he was piloting crashed into a home in Claremont, California, in December 2003. His initial theme was a remix of "Changing Keys", but by 2000, he replaced it with a composition of his own, which was titled "Happy Wheels". Since 2006, music direction has been handled by Frankie Blue and John Hoke. Themes they have written for the show include a remix of "Happy Wheels" and an original rock-based composition. A rearranged version of "Changing Keys" composed by Hoke and performed by Bleeding Fingers Music has been used as the main theme music starting in 2021.

In addition to "Changing Keys", Griffin also composed various incidental music cues for the syndicated version which were used for announcements of prizes in the show's early years. Among them were "Frisco Disco" (earlier the closing theme for a revival of Jeopardy! which aired in 1978 and 1979), "A Time for Tony" (whose basic melody evolved into "Think!", the longtime theme song for Jeopardy!), "Buzzword" (later used as the theme for Merv Griffin's Crosswords), "Nightwalk", "Struttin' on Sunset", and an untitled vacation cue.

Audition process

Anyone at least 18 years old has the potential to become a contestant through Wheel of Fortunes audition process. Exceptions include employees and immediate family members of ViacomCBS, Sony Pictures Entertainment, or any of their respective affiliates or subsidiaries; any firm involved in supplying prizes for the show; and television stations that broadcast Wheel and/or Jeopardy!, their sister radio stations or newspapers (if any), and those advertising agencies that are affiliated with them. Also ineligible to apply as contestants are individuals who have appeared on a different game show within the previous year, three other game shows within the past ten years, or on any version of Wheel of Fortune itself, including the 1997–98 children's version, Wheel 2000.

Throughout the year, the show uses a custom-designed Winnebago recreational vehicle called the "Wheelmobile" to travel across the United States, holding open auditions at various public venues. Participants are provided with entry forms which are then drawn randomly. Individuals whose names are drawn appear on stage, five at a time, and are interviewed by traveling host Marty Lublin. The group of five then plays a mock version of the speed-up round, and five more names are selected after a puzzle is solved. Everyone who is called onstage receives a themed prize, usually determined by the spin of a miniature wheel. Auditions typically last two days, with three one-hour segments per day. After each Wheelmobile event, the "most promising candidates" are invited back to the city in which the first audition was held, to participate in a second audition. Alternatively, a participant may submit an audition form with a self-shot video through the show's website to enter an audition. Contestants not appearing on stage at Wheelmobile events have their applications retained and get drawn at random to fill second-level audition vacancies. At the second audition, potential contestants play more mock games featuring a miniature wheel and puzzle board, followed by a 16-puzzle test with some letters revealed. The contestants have five minutes to solve as many puzzles as they can by writing in the correct letters. The people who pass continue the audition, playing more mock games which are followed by interviews.

Since the show's hiatus due to COVID-19 ended, all auditions have been conducted virtually.

Broadcast history
Wheel of Fortune premiered on January 6, 1975, at 10:30 am (9:30 Central) on NBC. Lin Bolen, then the head of daytime programming, purchased the show from Griffin to compensate him for canceling the original Jeopardy! series, which had one year remaining on its contract. Jeopardy! aired its final episode on the Friday before Wheel'''s premiere. The original Wheel aired on NBC, in varying time slots between 10:30 am and noon, until June 30, 1989. Throughout that version's run, episodes were generally 30 minutes in length, except for six weeks of shows aired between December 1975 and January 1976 which were 60 minutes in length. NBC announced the cancellation of the show in August 1980, but it stayed on the air following a decision to cut the duration of The David Letterman Show from 90 to 60 minutes. The network Wheel moved to CBS on July 17, 1989, and remained there until January 14, 1991. After that, it briefly returned to NBC, replacing Let's Make a Deal, but was canceled permanently on September 20 of that year.

The daily syndicated nighttime version of Wheel premiered on September 19, 1983. From its debut, the syndicated version offered a larger prize budget than its network counterpart. The show came from humble beginnings: King World chairmen Roger, Michael, and Robert King could initially find only 50 stations that were willing to carry the show, and since they could not find affiliates for the syndicated Wheel in New York, Los Angeles, or Chicago, Philadelphia was the largest market in which the show could succeed in its early days. Only nine stations carried the show from its beginning, but by midseason it was airing on all 50 of the stations that were initially willing to carry it, and by the beginning of 1984 the show was available to 99 percent of television households. Soon, Wheel succeeded Family Feud as the highest-rated syndicated show, and at the beginning of the 1984–85 season, Griffin followed up on the show's success by launching a syndicated revival of Jeopardy!, hosted by Alex Trebek. The syndicated success of Wheel and Jeopardy! siphoned ratings from the period's three longest-running and most popular game shows, Tic-Tac-Dough, The Joker's Wild, and Family Feud, to the point that all three series came to an end by the fall of 1986. At this point, Wheel had the highest ratings of any syndicated television series in history, and at the peak of the show's popularity, over 40 million people were watching five nights per week. The series, along with companion series Jeopardy!, remained the most-watched syndicated program in the United States until dethroned by Judge Judy in 2011. The program has become America's longest-running syndicated game show and its second-longest in either network or syndication, second to the version of The Price Is Right which began airing in 1972. In 1992, the show began airing on most of the owned-and-operated stations for ABC, currently known as the ABC Owned Television Stations. The syndicated Wheel has become part of the consciousness of over 90 million Americans, and awarded a total of over $200 million in cash and prizes to contestants.

The popularity of Wheel of Fortune has led it to become a worldwide franchise, with over forty known adaptations in international markets outside the United States. Versions of the show have existed in such countries as Australia, Brazil, Denmark, France, Germany, Italy, Malaysia, New Zealand, the Philippines, Poland, Russia, Spain, the United Kingdom, and Vietnam. The American version of Wheel has honored its international variants with an occasional theme of special weeks known as "Wheel Around the World", the inaugural episode of which aired when the 23rd syndicated season premiered on September 12, 2005.

Between September 1997 and January 1998, CBS and Game Show Network concurrently aired a special children's version of the show titled Wheel 2000. It was hosted by David Sidoni, with Tanika Ray providing voice and motion capture for a CGI hostess named "Cyber Lucy". Created by Scott Sternberg, the spin-off featured special gameplay in which numerous rules were changed. For example, the show's child contestants competed for points and prizes instead of cash, with the eventual winner playing for a grand prize in the bonus round.

Celebrity Wheel of Fortune
In November 2020, ABC ordered a prime time spin-off show, Celebrity Wheel of Fortune, with Richards as executive producer and Sajak and White as hosts, which premiered on January 7, 2021. Each hour-long episode consists of two complete games each consisting of three rounds, along with toss-ups and a bonus round in each game. The game features modified rules, including an additional cash bonus for each puzzle solved by a celebrity: $5,000 in Round 1, $10,000 in Round 2, and $20,000 in Round 3. Games in this format are played entirely for cash, with all winnings donated to a charity selected by that celebrity. In May 2021, ABC renewed Celebrity Wheel of Fortune for a second season, which premiered on September 26, 2021. In May 2022, ABC renewed Celebrity Wheel of Fortune for a third season, which premiered on September 25, 2022.

ReceptionWheel of Fortune has long been one of the highest-rated programs on U.S. syndicated television. It was the highest-rated show in all of syndication before it was dethroned by Two and a Half Men in 2010. The syndicated Wheel shared the Daytime Emmy Award for Outstanding Game/Audience Participation Show with Jeopardy! in 2011, and Sajak won three Daytime Emmys for Outstanding Game Show Host—in 1993, 1997, and 1998. In a 2001 issue, TV Guide ranked Wheel number 25 among the 50 Greatest Game Shows of All Time, and in 2013, the magazine ranked it number 2 in its list of the 60 greatest game shows ever, second only to Jeopardy! In August 2006, the show was ranked number 6 on GSN's list of the 50 Greatest Game Shows.Wheel was the subject of many nominations in GSN's Game Show Awards special, which aired on June 6, 2009. The show was nominated for Best Game Show, but lost to Are You Smarter Than a 5th Grader?. Sajak and White were nominated for Best Game Show Host, but lost to Deal or No Deals Howie Mandel; and O'Donnell was considered for Best Announcer but lost to Rich Fields from The Price Is Right. One of the catchphrases uttered by contestants, "I'd like to buy a vowel", was considered for Favorite Game Show Catch Phrase, but lost to "Come on down!", the announcer's catchphrase welcoming new contestants to Price. The sound effect heard at the start of a new regular gameplay round won the award for Favorite Game Show Sound Effect. The sound heard when the wheel lands on Bankrupt was also nominated. Despite having been retired from the show for nearly a decade by that point, "Changing Keys" was nominated for Best Game Show Theme Song. However, it lost to its fellow Griffin composition, "Think!" from Jeopardy!A hall of fame honoring Wheel of Fortune is part of the Sony Pictures Studios tour, and was introduced on the episode aired May 10, 2010. Located in the same stage as the show's taping facility, this hall of fame features memorabilia related to Wheels syndicated history, including retired props, classic merchandise, photographs, videos, and a special case dedicated to White's wardrobe. Two years later, in 2012, the show was honored with a Ride of Fame on a double-decker tour bus in New York City.

Merchandise
Numerous board games based on Wheel of Fortune have been released by different toy companies. The games are all similar, incorporating a wheel, puzzle display board, play money and various accessories like Free Spin tokens. Milton Bradley released the first board game in 1975. In addition to all the supplies mentioned above, the game included 20 prize cards to simulate the "shopping" prizes of the show, with prizes ranging in value from $100 to $3,000. Two editions were released, with the only differences being the box art and the included books of puzzles. Other home versions were released by Pressman Toy Corporation, Tyco/Mattel, Parker Brothers, Endless Games, and Irwin Toys.

Additionally, several video games based on the show have been released for personal computers, the Internet, and various gaming consoles spanning multiple hardware generations. Most games released in the 20th century were published by GameTek, which produced a dozen Wheel games on various platforms, starting with a Nintendo Entertainment System game released in 1987 and continuing until the company closed in 1998 after filing for Chapter 11 bankruptcy protection. Subsequent games were published by Hasbro Interactive and its acquirer Infogrames/Atari; Sony Online Entertainment, THQ and Ubisoft.Wheel has also been licensed to International Game Technology for use in its slot machines. The games are all loosely based on the show, with contestants given the chance to spin the wheel to win a jackpot prize. Since 1996, over 200 slot games based on the show have been created, both for real-world casinos and those on the Internet. With over 1,000 wins awarded in excess of $1,000,000 and over $3 billion in jackpots delivered, Wheel has been regarded as the most successful slots brand of all time.

On March 8, 2023 BetMGM announced that it had launched a Wheel of Fortune online Casino in New Jersey. The casino operates under the Borgata Hotel Casino & Spa online gambling license. The Wheel of Fortune Casino is run in collaboration with IGT who own the license for Wheel of Fortune Slot Machines.

In May 2022, a touring staged production show, Wheel of Fortune Live!, was announced, to be produced by Right Angle Entertainment in partnership with Sony and United Talent Agency, with an initial run of over 60 dates from September to December 2022, and 2023 dates to be announced at a later time. Similar to The Price Is Right Live!'', the touring version will feature alternate hosts that have yet to be announced, not Sajak or White.

Notes

References

Citations

Works cited

External links

 
 
 

1970s American game shows
1975 American television series debuts
1980s American game shows
1983 American television series debuts
1990s American game shows
1991 American television series endings
2000s American game shows
2010s American game shows
2020s American game shows
American Broadcasting Company original programming
CBS original programming
Culver City, California
Daytime Emmy Award for Outstanding Game Show winners
English-language television shows
First-run syndicated television programs in the United States
NBC original programming
Roulette and wheel games
Television productions suspended due to the COVID-19 pandemic
Television series by CBS Studios
Television series by Merv Griffin Enterprises
Television series by Sony Pictures Television
Television series created by Merv Griffin
Wheel of Fortune (franchise)
Television series by King World Productions
Television articles with disputed naming style
Television shows adapted into video games